This is a list of German television related events from 1960.

Events
6 February - Wyn Hoop is selected to represent Germany at the 1960 Eurovision Song Contest with his song "Bonne nuit ma chérie". He is selected to be the fifth German Eurovision entry during Schlagerparade held at the Rhein-Main-Halle in Wiesbaden.

Debuts

ARD
 22 January – Die Firma Hesselbach (1960–1967)
 21 February – Parkstraße 13 (1960)
 24 February –  Es geschah an der Grenze (1960)
 22 March – Am grünen Strand der Spree (1960)
 9 July –  Der blaue Heinrich (1960)
 21 October – The Time Has Come (1960)

DFF
 21 March –  Der schwarze Kanal (1960–1989)
 2 October –  Heute bei Krügers  (1960–1963)
 19 November –  Moabiter Miniaturen (1960–1961)

Television shows

1950s
Tagesschau (1952–present)

Ending this year

Births

Deaths